FIFA has licensed FIFA World Cup video games since 1986, of which only a few were received positively by the critics, but given the popularity of the competition, they all did positively on the market, and the license is one of the most sought-after. Originally in the hands of U.S. Gold, Electronic Arts acquired it in 1997 and is the current holder.

World Cup Carnival (Mexico '86)

World Cup Carnival, was released by U.S. Gold, for the Commodore 64, the ZX Spectrum and the Amstrad CPC. While the license was acquired with time to spare, internal problems plagued the project's development. As the 1986 FIFA World Cup was coming closer, U.S. Gold decided to acquire the rights of an older game, World Cup Football by Artic, re-fit it with the properly licensed items, and market it as a new title. However, this late effort was received with cynicism from all in the video game industry: gamers, retailers and reviewers alike.

World Cup Soccer: Italia '90

Virgin Mastertronic released the official home computer game of the 1990 World Cup. It was released on Amiga, Amstrad CPC, Atari ST, Commodore 64, DOS and ZX Spectrum. Like the 1986 game, this was actually a reworked existing game (World Trophy Soccer). The game is presented in a bird's-eye view but when the player gets near the goal, it switches to a 3D view of the penalty area and the player must try to score before a defender arrives on screen. The player can only choose to play as England, Belgium, Italy or Spain. The teams do not have the correct coloured strips and the tournament is not the same as the actual World Cup.

Virgin also released official console games in Europe as World Cup Italia '90 for the Sega Mega Drive and Master System consoles. The Mega Drive version is a port of World Championship Soccer. The Master System version was another game, also released as Super Futebol II in Brazil.

A number of unofficial games were also released including Italy 1990 by previous license holders U.S. Gold.

World Cup USA '94

This game from U.S. Gold was ported to most active platforms of the day: DOS, Amiga, Mega Drive/Genesis, Sega CD, Master System, SNES and handhelds Game Boy and Game Gear. The Sega CD version included a CD soundtrack including two songs by the Scorpions and FMV views of 3D renders of the stadiums used in the competition.

World Cup 98 (France)

For the first time in a football game, accurate national team kits were introduced complete with kit manufacturer logos and official merchandise. The game built on the previously released FIFA: Road to World Cup 98 engine, although it features some minor gameplay improvements such as in-game strategy changes and more tactically accurate player positioning. As in the FIFA series, World Cup 98 features a song in the menu: "Tubthumping", by Chumbawamba. The game also features voice-overs by Des Lynam and Gary Lineker in the team schedules. The World Cup classic mode is also an interesting feature, with classic black and white sepia-toned graphics and commentary by Kenneth Wolstenholme creating the feeling of watching an old World Cup game. The playable teams also included several nations that did not qualify for the finals, but were considered too important to exclude. It was released for Windows, PlayStation, Nintendo 64 and Game Boy.

Jikkyou World Soccer: World Cup France 98

In Japan, Konami was granted the FIFA World Cup licence to produce the Nintendo 64 video game Jikkyou World Soccer: World Cup France 98.  It was developed by Konami's Osaka based team, KCEO, and was only released in Japan.  This was released in the rest of the world as International Superstar Soccer '98, without the official FIFA World Cup licence, branding or real player names.

World Soccer Jikkyou Winning Eleven 3: World Cup France '98

In Japan, Konami was granted the FIFA World Cup licence to produce the PlayStation video game World Soccer Jikkyou Winning Eleven 3: World Cup France '98.  It was developed by Konami's Tokyo based team, KCET, and was only released in Japan.  This was released in the rest of the world as International Superstar Soccer Pro '98, without the official FIFA World Cup licence, branding or real player names.

World Cup '98 France: Road to Win
In Japan, Sega was granted the FIFA World Cup licence to produce the Saturn video game World Cup '98 France: Road to Win.

2002 FIFA World Cup (Korea/Japan)

An amalgamation between the game engines of FIFA Football 2002 and FIFA Football 2003, the game still incorporates the power bar for shots and crosses but with a steeper learning curve and higher chances of being penalized by the match referee. The national team kits are accurate along with player likeness and the stadia of the 2002 FIFA World Cup. Unlike the previous games in the FIFA series, the game had an original soundtrack performed by the Vancouver Symphony Orchestra.

It was released for Windows, PlayStation, PlayStation 2, Nintendo GameCube, and Xbox.

The game was a launch title for Nintendo GameCube in Europe.

2006 FIFA World Cup (Germany)

Created by EA Sports and was released during the last two weeks of April 2006. This game features not only the World Cup finals themselves, but the six regional qualification rounds. There are 127 national teams. You can also create a player and put in your favorite team. There are minor improvements in the game play over FIFA 06. The Global Challenge Mode includes 40 challenges based upon classic matches of the World Cup or qualification matches. Penalty Shoot-Out mode offers a more realistic experience.

2010 FIFA World Cup (South Africa)

The included teams were confirmed by Electronic Arts on 17 February 2010. The game contains 199 of the 204 national teams that took part in the 2010 FIFA World Cup qualification process. Electronic Arts stated that they have included every team that FIFA have permitted them to use, with some others not being allowed for "various reasons". The five teams that were in the draw for World Cup qualifying but are not included in the game are African teams Central African Republic, Eritrea, and São Tomé and Príncipe, and Asian teams Bhutan and Guam. All five withdrew from the qualifying stage before it began. Additionally, the game does not feature Brunei, Laos, Papua New Guinea, and the Philippines who did not participate in World Cup qualifying.

The game includes all 10 venues used at the 2010 FIFA World Cup, as well as stadiums from each qualifying region and a range of "generic" stadiums.

2014 FIFA World Cup (Brazil)

The game contains all of the 203 national teams that took part in the 2014 FIFA World Cup qualification process. The national teams of Bhutan, Brunei, Guam, Mauritania and South Sudan, all of which did not participate in World Cup qualifying, and Mauritius, that withdrew before playing any match, are not featured in the game.

The game includes all 12 venues used at the 2014 FIFA World Cup, as well as stadiums from each qualifying region and a range of "generic" stadiums.

There's also an EA-licensed collectible card game for Android and iOS: 2014 FIFA World Cup Brazil World-class Soccer. The game is released in Japan and mainland China only.

FIFA 18 DLC (Russia)

On 30 April 2018, EA announced a free expansion for FIFA 18 based on the 2018 FIFA World Cup, featuring all 32 participating teams (and the ones already featured in FIFA 18) and all 12 stadiums used at the 2018 FIFA World Cup. There is no regional qualifying rounds that lead up to the World Cup to be feature on this DLC like there was for the previous three World Cup games. This update was released on 29 May on PlayStation 4, Xbox One, Windows and Nintendo Switch, with an update to mobile devices later, on 6 June. Coins transfer over from the actual Ultimate Team game and there is no transfer market, meaning all players have to be obtained from packs.

FIFA 23 DLC (Qatar)

FIFA 23 features both men's and women's World Cup game modes, replicating the 2022 FIFA World Cup and the 2023 FIFA Women's World Cup. Once again this expansion does not feature a World Cup qualification mode that leads to the actual World Cup itself and only offers the tournament with the participating teams just like the previous 2018 DLC edition. Unlike the previous World Cup games, this mode doesn't include all tournament stadiums, as it includes only two out of eight stadiums.

See also

UEFA European Championship video games
UEFA Champions League video games

References

External links
MobyGames links for:
Italy 1990 (US Gold), World Cup Italia 90 (Sega)World Cup USA '94World Cup 982002 FIFA World Cup''

 
Electronic Arts franchises
World Cup